The 1999 Kebbi State gubernatorial election occurred on January 9, 1999. APP candidate Adamu Aliero won the election, defeating PDP candidate Mohammed Kaliel.

Results
Adamu Aliero from the APP won the election. PDP candidate Mohammed Kaliel and AD candidate contested in the election.

The total number of registered voters in the state was 1,167,171, total votes cast was 500,938, valid votes was 472,062 and rejected votes was 28,876.

Adamu Aliero, APP- 259,498
Mohammed Kaliel, PDP- 208,552
AD- 4,013

References 

Kebbi State gubernatorial election
Kebbi State gubernatorial election
1999